Districts of Hungary are the second-level divisions of Hungary after counties. They replaced the 175 subregions of Hungary in 2013. Altogether, there are 174 districts in the 19 counties, and there are 23 districts in Budapest. Districts of the 19 counties are numbered by Arabic numerals and named after the district seat, while districts of Budapest are numbered by Roman numerals and named after the historical towns and neighbourhoods. In Hungarian, the districts of the capital and the rest of the country hold different titles. The districts of Budapest are called kerületek (lit. district, pl.) and the districts of the country are called járások.

By county

Baranya County

Bács-Kiskun County

Békés County

Borsod-Abaúj-Zemplén County

Csongrád-Csanád County

Fejér County

Győr-Moson-Sopron County

Hajdú-Bihar County

Heves County

Jász-Nagykun-Szolnok County

Komárom-Esztergom County

Nógrád County

Pest County

Somogy County

Szabolcs-Szatmár-Bereg County

Tolna County

Vas County

Veszprém County

Zala County

Statistics
Not including districts in Budapest.

By area

Biggest districts by area
 Kaposvár District, (Somogy) – 1,591.36 km
 Kecskemét District, (Bács-Kiskun) – 1,212.21 km
 Kiskőrös District, (Bács-Kiskun) – 1,130.33 km
 Berettyóújfalu District, (Hajdú-Bihar) – 1,073.90 km
 Kalocsa District, (Bács-Kiskun) – 1,062.27 km
 Zalaegerszeg District, (Zala) – 1,044.70 km
 Székesfehérvár District, (Fejér) – 1,032.05 km
 Pápa District, (Veszprém) – 1,022.09 km
 Tamási District, (Tolna) – 1,019.94 km
 Baja District, (Bács-Kiskun) – 1,008.80 km

Lowest districts by area
 Dunakeszi District, (Pest) – 103.07 km
 Vecsés District, (Pest) – 119.74 km
 Pilisvörösvár District, (Pest) – 130.81 km
 Hajdúhadház District, (Hajdú-Bihar) – 137.02 km
 Záhony District, (Szabolcs-Szatmár-Bereg) – 145.92 km
 Gyál District, (Pest) – 170.99 km
 Bélapátfalva District, (Heves) – 180.89 km
 Érd District, (Pest) – 184.29 km
 Oroszlány District, (Komárom-Esztergom) – 199.39 km
 Tolna District, (Tolna) – 205.24 km

By population

Biggest districts by population (2015)
 Miskolc District, (Borsod-Abaúj-Zemplén) – 240,279
 Debrecen District, (Hajdú-Bihar) – 216,467
 Szeged District, (Csongrád) – 198,494
 Győr District, (Győr-Moson-Sopron) – 192,068
 Pécs District, (Baranya) – 178,291
 Nyíregyháza District, (Szabolcs-Szatmár-Bereg) – 165,805
 Kecskemét District, (Bács-Kiskun) – 156,571
 Székesfehérvár District, (Fejér) – 152,550
 Gödöllő District, (Pest) – 141,853
 Érd District, (Pest) – 118,735

Lowest districts by population (2015)
 Bélapátfalva District, (Heves) – 8,570
 Pécsvárad District, (Baranya) – 11,567
 Bóly District, (Baranya) – 11,607
 Hegyhát District, (Baranya) – 12,405
 Tab District, (Somogy) – 12,497
 Tokaj District, (Borsod-Abaúj-Zemplén) – 12,966
 Vasvár District, (Vas) – 13,326
 Csenger District, (Szabolcs-Szatmár-Bereg) – 13,761
 Sellye District, (Baranya) – 13,986
 Mezőcsát District, (Borsod-Abaúj-Zemplén) – 14,351

By pop. density

Biggest districts by population density (2015)
 Dunakeszi District, (Pest) – 783/km
 Érd District, (Pest) – 644/km
 Szigetszentmiklós District, (Pest) – 530/km
 Debrecen District, (Hajdú-Bihar) – 408/km
 Pilisvörösvár District, (Pest) – 406/km
 Vecsés District, (Pest) – 398/km
 Gödöllő District, (Pest) – 316/km
 Budakeszi District, (Pest) – 299/km
 Pécs District, (Baranya) – 286/km
 Szeged District, (Csongrád) – 268/km

Lowest districts by population density (2015)
 Sellye District, (Baranya) – 28/km
 Tab District, (Somogy) – 29/km
 Lenti District, (Zala) – 31/km
 Csurgó District, (Somogy) – 33/km Gönc District, (Borsod-Abaúj-Zemplén) Barcs District, (Somogy)
 Hegyhát District, (Baranya) – 34/km Gyomaendrőd District, (Békés)
 Devecser District, (Veszprém) – 35/km
 Vasvár District, (Vas) – 36/km Balmazújváros District, (Hajdú-Bihar)

By municipalities

Biggest districts by number of municipalities
 Zalaegerszeg District, (Zala) – 84
 Kaposvár District, (Somogy) – 78
 Siklós District, (Baranya) – 53
 Fehérgyarmat District, (Szabolcs-Szatmár-Bereg) – 50
 Pápa District, (Veszprém) – 49 Nagykanizsa District, (Zala)
 Lenti District, (Zala) – 48
 Körmend District, (Vas) – 46
 Szigetvár District, (Baranya) – 45 Edelény District, (Borsod-Abaúj-Zemplén)

Lowest districts by number of municipalities
 Debrecen District, (Hajdú-Bihar) – 2 Hajdúböszörmény District, (Hajdú-Bihar)
 Hajdúhadház District, (Hajdú-Bihar) – 3 Nagykőrös District, (Pest)
 Gyula District, (Békés) – 4 Csongrád District, (Csongrád) Hódmezővásárhely District, (Csongrád) Dunakeszi District, (Pest) Gyál District, (Pest) Vecsés District, (Pest) Tolna District, (Tolna)

See also 
 Regions of Hungary
 Counties of Hungary
 Districts of Hungary (from 2013)
 Subregions of Hungary (until 2013)
 Administrative divisions of the Kingdom of Hungary (until 1918)
 Counties of the Kingdom of Hungary
 Administrative divisions of the Kingdom of Hungary (1941–1945)
 List of cities and towns of Hungary
 NUTS:HU

 
Districts, Hungary